Fannin County Courthouse may refer to:

 Fannin County Courthouse (Georgia)
 Fannin County Courthouse (Texas)